William Brantingham was an English clergyman of the sixteenth century and a member of the Brantingham family.  He held various posts, including seneschal of the prior of Durham in 1536–1537, and was a gospeller from 1541 until his death in 1548.  Brantingham lived in Dun Cow Lane, Lydgate, from 1540.

References

Bibliography
.

16th-century English clergy
1548 deaths
Year of birth unknown